Henry Haynes may refer to:

 Henry Haynes (cricketer) (1834-1892), Barbadian cricketer
 Henry Botting Haynes, Anglican priest
 Henry Williamson Haynes (1831–1912), American archaeologist
 Henry D. "Homer" Haynes (1920–1971), American comedy entertainer and musician